Schwagstock is a music festival that takes place over the course of a weekend in an outdoor setting, and is intended to carry on the vibe of the Woodstock festival. Food, trinkets, glassware, carvings, beads, blankets, tie-dye clothing, and many other handmade and hippie-appeal items are available for sale by individual vendors.  Attendees are allowed to camp anywhere they wish on the campgrounds, and may choose to set up tents or to camp in their vehicles instead. Music is scheduled such that there are several overlapping live music acts between the main stage and the sideshow(s) from early afternoon until early morning.  Past Schwagstocks have been held at Lesterville, Leasburg and Bagnell Dam in Missouri, and in Iowa, but as of 2004 all Schwagstocks are held at Camp Zoe, south of Salem, Shannon County, MO.

Activities
Besides for the camping and concerts, attendees can swim, canoe, hike, float down the river, and explore caves. Camp Zoe has about 370 acres of land that can be explored. There are bluffs, caves, beaches, creeks, trees, ferns, hills, and natural wildlife. Zoe is surrounded by thousands of acres of national forest and private timber reserves.

Legalities
On November 8, 2010, the United States Drug Enforcement Administration filed court documents alleging that the Schwagstock festival is the site of widespread, rampant use and sales of illegal drugs. Investigations date all the way back to 2006 until November 1, 2010, when Camp Zoe was raided. The paperwork shows that the authorities hope to use a mechanism called asset forfeiture to take the property. Under a forfeiture, they do not need to convict the property's owners of a crime or even charge them with one.  Even though Jimmy Tebeau has not pleaded guilty to a crime, the government has to show a "preponderance of evidence" that the property was part of criminal activity. The agency seized the Camp Zoe property.
Since Zoe was shut down at the infamous Spookstock. The property seizure was made possible under 21 USC § 856, which allows for federal seizure and civil forfeiture of an property used primarily for drug activity. The law can only be used to seize individual property, and the move against Jimmy Tebeau marks the only time the federal "crackhouse law" was ever used against the owner of a music festival venue; as corporations are immune from such seizure, had Tebeau incorporated his ownership under an LLC, there could have been no seizure. Subsequent to the seizure, Camp Zoe was developed into a corporate retreat and state park, with $62 million in private contract development

Band history
The Schwag was created in 1992 by Jimmy Tebeau and Tracy Lowe. In their own words, The Schwag is "a band out to preserve and perpetuate the vibe and music made popular by the Grateful Dead."  The band has played over 1500 shows since then, in at least 18 U.S. states. Recently it has just celebrated its 17th year of playing as a musical entity. Notable guest performers have included Mike Gordon, Butch Trucks, Chuck Berry, Vince Welnick, Melvin Seals, Michael Kang, Bill Nershi, Michael Travis, Jason Hann, Mike and Liz from Rusted Root, Merl Saunders, Keller Williams, Fred Tackett of Little Feat,  Johnnie Johnson, and Devon Allman.  The other members of the band arrive and depart as conditions dictate.  The lineup usually consists of Jimmy; a guitar player (such as Eric Eisen  from the Helping Phriendly band, Michael Kang of The String Cheese Incident, Shawn Guyot (deceased), (TIM MOODY) Darrell Lea, Brad Sarno, Tracy Lowe, Nick Romanoff(deceased)); a keyboard/organ player (such as Nate Carpenter(now in DOWNSTEREO) Jack Kirkner (now in Honeytribe); and a drummer (such as Tony Antonelli Dave Klein, Dino English, Cannon DeWeese (now in DOWNSTEREO).

In 2005, the Missouri House of Representatives passed a resolution applauding Jimmy Tebeau for his "entrepreneurial spirit and creative skills".   A plaque commemorating the resolution was presented to Jimmy at a 2005 Schwagstock.

The Band Now
Jimmy and the new band manager have worked hard to make the band a noticeable presence and the acquisition of Camp Zoe in Salem, Missouri, which has attracted The String Cheese Incident's band members and management involvement, has made the band a popular player in the jamband circuit.  Schwagstocks have become increasingly popular at Camp Zoe and with SCI's management involvement.

JGB guitarist Stu Allen joined the band in 2008, which has increased the band's profile and sound. They are still traveling and playing shows for people all over the U.S.

See also

List of jam band music festivals

Notes

References
Fans Still Grateful After 40 Years Ben Palosaari, (July 26, 2007).
Taking Stock in The Schwag (The Telegraph, 5/19/2006)
Jimmy Tebeau and Schwag are turning Deadheads everywhere Steve Paul, (March 3, 2004).
Schwagstock 10 offers good vibes, friendly faces and Grateful Dead-inspired jams  Christopher Lawton, (July 25, 2001).
Schwagstock  Jim Hanselman, (May 29, 2004).

External links
Schwagstock
Zoe Campground Amphitheatre
The Schwag's Homepage
The Schwag's MySpace
The Schwag collection at the Internet Archive's live music archive
The Schwags Facebook

Rock festivals in the United States
Jam band festivals
Music festivals established in 1992
Music festivals in Missouri